Jeffrey A. Carver (born 1949) is an American science fiction author.
He was born in Cleveland, graduated from Brown University,
and lives outside of Boston, Massachusetts with his family. His 2000 novel Eternity's End was a nominee at the 2001 Nebula Awards; in 2022 he was honored with the Helicon Lifetime Achievement Award.

In 1995, Carver developed and hosted the educational TV series Science Fiction and Fantasy Writing, which has since been made available online.

Bibliography
The Chaos Chronicles
Neptune Crossing (1994), 
Strange Attractors (1995), 
The Infinite Sea (1996), 
Sunborn (2008), 
The Reefs of Time (2019)
Crucible of Time (2019)

The Star Rigger universe
Seas of Ernathe (1976), 
Star Rigger's Way (1978, revised edition 1994), 
Panglor (1980, revised edition 1996), 
Dragons in the Stars (1992), 
Dragon Rigger (1993), 
Eternity's End (2000), 

Starstream series
From a Changeling Star (1989), 
Down the Stream of Stars (1990), 

Other novels
The Infinity Link (1984)
The Rapture Effect (1987)
Roger Zelazny's Alien Speedway: Clypsis (1987)
Battlestar Galactica – novelization of the 2003 miniseries (2006), 

Short fiction
Of No Return (1974)
Though All the Mountains Lie Between (1980)
Reality and Other Fictions (2012)
Going Alien (2012)

References

External links
 Science Fiction Worlds of Jeffrey A. Carver
 Jeffrey A. Carver's blog, Pushing a Snake Up a Hill
 Writing Science Fiction and Fantasy, an online guide to the crafting of SF and fantasy, covering fundamentals of turning ideas into stories, creating believable characters, language and style, workshopping, etc.  Geared for young adult aspiring writers, but not limited to that group.
 
 Additional information at Scifipedia

20th-century American novelists
21st-century American novelists
American male novelists
American science fiction writers
1949 births
Living people
Brown University alumni
American male short story writers
20th-century American short story writers
21st-century American short story writers
20th-century American male writers
21st-century American male writers